Vanessa Diane Gilmore (born October 26, 1956) is a former United States district judge of the United States District Court for the Southern District of Texas. She was appointed to this position by President Bill Clinton in 1994. At that time, she was the youngest sitting federal judge in the United States. She was also the first graduate of the University of Houston to be appointed to the federal bench.

Education and career

Gilmore was born in St. Albans, New York and raised in Silver Spring, Maryland. She earned her Bachelor of Science from Hampton University in 1977, and received her Juris Doctor from the University of Houston Law Center in 1981. Upon graduation in 1981, Gilmore began a 13-year tenure at the Houston, Texas law firm of Vickery, Kilbride, Gilmore and Vickery where she specialized in civil litigation. Gilmore also became an active member of the Houston civic community, serving on the boards of a number of civic and charitable organizations. She also became involved in the Texas political arena while serving as counsel and teacher in the area of election law. She worked as an adjunct professor at the University of Houston College of Law teaching research and writing in 1984.

Her civic activities outside of the courtroom brought her to the attention of Governor Ann Richards, who in 1991 appointed Gilmore to the Texas Department of Commerce Policy Board, where she also served as chairperson from 1992 to 1994. Her appointment to that board made Gilmore the first African-American to serve on this board responsible for increasing business and tourism and job training development in Texas. In 1993, she also served as chairperson of Texans for NAFTA (the North American Free Trade Agreement). In this capacity, she worked regularly with diplomatic leaders, including the President of Mexico, to increase U.S. trade opportunities.

Federal judicial service

On March 22, 1994, Gilmore was nominated by President Clinton to a new seat on the United States District Court for the Southern District of Texas created by 104 Stat. 5089. She was confirmed by the United States Senate on June 8, 1994, and received her commission the following day. In 2005 she presided over the Enron Broadband trial and over the environmental case relating to the building of the Galveston cruise ship terminal. Gilmore retired on January 2, 2022.

Writings

Motivated in part by her own experiences as an adoptive mother, she decided to write about adoption. Her novel, Saving the Dream, tells the story of a young woman and her decision to have her baby or give it up for adoption and alternately explores the life her son might have lived in each world.

Her book, Lynn's Angels - The True Story of E. Lynn Harris and the Women Who Loved Him tells the story of the life of the late author E. Lynn Harris and the five women who comprised the family that he invented for himself that he called "Lynn's Angels". It explores the universal concept of voluntary kinship with the goal of helping others appreciate the significance of their own invented families. She is also the co-author of a children's book entitled "A Boy Named Rocky:  A Coloring Book for the Children of Incarcerated Parents" and is a frequent speaker and lecturer on issues related to these children and their families. She has assisted with and instituted initiatives to help these families with access to resources for their children, including the development of a legal clinic at Texas Southern University. Her book, "You Can't Make This Stuff Up: Tales From a Judicial Diva", is an autobiographical look at her life on and off the bench.

Personal life
Gilmore is mother of Sean Harrison Gilmore, an entrepreneur. She is the recipient of numerous civic awards for community service and served as president of the YWCA of Houston, as a member of the Board of Trustees for Hampton University for seventeen years, the Board of Trustees for the River Oaks Baptist School and on the advisory board of Inprint, a literary arts organization for readers and writers.  A golfer, she also served on the board of First Tee of Houston.  She serves on the boards of the DePelchin Children’s Center and Texas Children’s Hospital.

See also 
 List of African-American federal judges
 List of African-American jurists

References

External links

Gilmore's website

1956 births
Living people
20th-century American judges
20th-century American women judges
21st-century American judges
21st-century American women judges
African-American judges
Hampton University alumni
Judges of the United States District Court for the Southern District of Texas
United States district court judges appointed by Bill Clinton
University of Houston alumni
University of Houston Law Center alumni
Writers from Texas